Gaza is an unincorporated community in O'Brien County, Iowa, United States. Gaza is located at 
.

History
Gaza got its start in the year 1888, following construction of the Illinois Central Railroad through that territory. It was named after Gaza, in the Middle East. Gaza's population was 42 in 1902.

Education
South O'Brien Community School District operates schools serving the community. The district was formed on July 1, 1993, by the merger of three school districts: Paullina, Primghar, and Sutherland.

References

Unincorporated communities in O'Brien County, Iowa
Unincorporated communities in Iowa